Claypool Hill is a census-designated place (CDP) in Tazewell County, Virginia, United States. The population was 1,776 at the 2010 census, which was up from the 1,719 reported in 2000. Claypool is part of the Bluefield WV-VA micropolitan area which has a population of 107,578.

Geography
Claypool Hill is located at  (37.062842, −81.756355).

According to the United States Census Bureau, the CDP has a total area of 3.9 square miles (10.1 km2), all land.

Demographics

As of the census of 2000, there were 1,719 people, 710 households, and 565 families residing in the CDP. The population density was 442.3 people per square mile (170.6/km2). There were 760 housing units at an average density of 195.5/sq mi (75.4/km2). The racial makeup of the CDP was 98.95% White, 0.06% African American, 0.17% Native American, 0.52% Asian, 0.12% from other races, and 0.17% from two or more races. Hispanic or Latino of any race were 1.11% of the population.

There were 710 households, out of which 29.3% had children under the age of 18 living with them, 68.0% were married couples living together, 8.7% had a female householder with no husband present, and 20.4% were non-families. 18.9% of all households were made up of individuals, and 7.0% had someone living alone who was 65 years of age or older. The average household size was 2.42 and the average family size was 2.74.

In the CDP, the population was spread out, with 20.0% under the age of 18, 6.6% from 18 to 24, 27.1% from 25 to 44, 33.7% from 45 to 64, and 12.6% who were 65 years of age or older. The median age was 42 years. For every 100 females, there were 89.7 males. For every 100 females age 18 and over, there were 89.3 males.

The median income for a household in the CDP was $36,382, and the median income for a family was $42,321. Males had a median income of $30,878 versus $21,493 for females. The per capita income for the CDP was $19,588. About 9.5% of families and 13.1% of the population were below the poverty line, including 21.5% of those under age 18 and 7.0% of those age 65 or over.

References

Census-designated places in Tazewell County, Virginia
Census-designated places in Virginia